Denny Matthews (born November 14, 1942) is an American sportscaster, best known as a play-by-play announcer for Major League Baseball's Kansas City Royals since the team's inception in .

Early history 
Matthews grew up in Bloomington, Illinois and attended Illinois Wesleyan University, where he played baseball and football, and belonged to the Sigma Chi fraternity. He worked for local radio and television stations in Peoria and St. Louis before his hiring by the Royals.

Broadcast career 
Matthews has broadcast for the Royals since their inception in 1969, when he was the sidekick to Bud Blattner.  Blattner retired in 1974, and Matthews has been the Royals' top broadcaster since then.  From 1974 to 1998 – a stretch that includes the best seasons in the Royals' history – Matthews was paired with Fred White. In 1999, the two also teamed up to write a book called Play by Play: 25 Years of Royals on Radio, which recounts anecdotes from those seasons. Matthews also called baseball events for the national CBS Radio network in the 1980s.

In 1999, the Royals fired White and replaced him with the younger Ryan Lefebvre. Despite a tremendous age difference, Matthews and Lefebvre integrated their styles well and their dry wit and rapport became popular with Royals fans.

In 2008, Matthews cut back on his broadcast schedule, traveling to fewer road games, turning many of those chores over to Bob Davis and Steve Stewart (who succeeded Lefebvre in the Royals' radio booth while the latter shifted to television). However, Matthews broadcast the first road trip of that season from Detroit and Minnesota while Davis was broadcasting the Kansas Jayhawks' run to the national basketball championship. Matthews handled most of the home schedule and much of the September slate, when Davis turned his attention to broadcasting Jayhawks football games. Steve Physioc replaced Davis on the Royals' broadcast team in 2009.

Matthews' broadcasts and longevity have made him a popular figure in Kansas City. Baseball historian and statistician Bill James is among his fans, and has written:

 

Since the retirement of longtime Los Angeles Dodgers announcer Vin Scully (who'd been calling that team's games since 1950) following the 2016 season, and Dodgers' Spanish-language broadcaster Jaime Jarrín (1959–2022), Matthews' tenure with the Royals is the longest continuous tenure with one team among active Major League Baseball announcer. In January 2015, Matthews signed a contract extension to keep him calling Royals games through his and the team's 50th season in 2018. He signed a new contract in 2018 and continues to call games as of the 2022 season.

Awards 
Matthews was inducted into the Royals Hall of Fame in 2004 and the Missouri Sports Hall of Fame in 2005. He was presented with the Ford C. Frick Award by the National Baseball Hall of Fame in 2007.

Bibliography 
 Denny Matthews, Fred White, and Matt Fulks (1999). Play by Play: 25 Years of Royals on Radio

References

External links 
Denny Matthews Ford C. Frick Award biography at the National Baseball Hall of Fame

Living people
American radio sports announcers
Ford C. Frick Award recipients
Illinois Wesleyan Titans baseball players
Illinois Wesleyan Titans football players
Kansas City Chiefs announcers
Kansas City Royals announcers
Major League Baseball broadcasters
National Football League announcers
Sportspeople from Bloomington, Illinois
Sportspeople from Jacksonville, Florida
1942 births